KSAZ may refer to:

KSAZ (AM), a radio station (580 AM) licensed to Marana, Arizona, United States
KSAZ-TV, a television station (channel 10) licensed to Phoenix, Arizona, United States
The ICAO airport code for Staples Municipal Airport, located in Staples, Minnesota, United States
Kokang Self-Administered Zone